Jaimie Isaac is a Winnipeg-based Anishinaabe artist and curator.

Early life and education 
Isaac is of Ojibway and British descent and is a member of Sagkeeng First Nation. She holds a master's degree from the University of British Columbia and a BA in art history with an Arts and Cultural Management Certificate from the University of Winnipeg.  Her Masters of Arts thesis was titled, "Decolonizing curatorial practice: acknowledging Indigenous cultural praxis, mapping its agency, recognizing its aesthetic within contemporary Canadian art."

Career 
Jamie is a founding member of The Ephemerals Collective, an all-female Indigenous arts collective based out of Winnipeg.  She has sat on the boards of numerous Canadian art organizations including the Aboriginal Curatorial Collective and the Aboriginal Manitoba Music association.

In 2010, Isaac was employed as the visual arts coordinator for the Truth and Reconciliation Commission of Canada. In 2016, Isaac was co-faculty with artist Duane Linklater at the Summer Institute of the Wood Land School at Plug In Institute.

From 2015 to 2017, Isaac served as the Winnipeg Art Gallery's Aboriginal Curatorial Resident, a position funded by the Canada Council for the Arts.

In 2017, Isaac was hired as Curator of Indigenous and Contemporary Art at the Winnipeg Art Gallery. In 2021, she was appointed chief curator at the Art Gallery of Greater Victoria.

Work

Writing 
 "Reflections on Unsettling Narratives of Denial" in The Land We Are Now: Writers and Artists Unsettle the Politics of Reconciliation (Winnipeg: ARP Books, 2015).
 "In Dialogue: Scott Benesiinaabandan’s waabana’iwewin" in Public 54: Indigenous Art: New Media and the Digital, 2016.
 With Leach Decter, "(official denial) trade value in progress: Unsettling Narratives" in Reconcile This! (West Coast Line 71, no. 2, 2012).

Exhibitions 
 Curated with Julie Nagam, Insurgence/Resurgence, Winnipeg Art Gallery, 2017 
 Vernon Ah Kee: cantchant, Winnipeg Art Gallery 
 Curator, Border X, Winnipeg Art Gallery, 2016.
 Curator, We Are On Treaty Land, Winnipeg Art Gallery, 2015-2016.
 Quiyuktchigaewin; Making Good, Winnipeg Art Gallery
 With Leah Decter, official denial (trade value in progress), travelling participatory art project, across Canada, 2011-2015.
 Creator, Burning an Effigy, film, 2014.

Awards and nominations 
 Participant in Canada Council for the Art's Indigenous delegation, Venice Biennale, 2017.
 Finalist, Making a Difference Award, Winnipeg Arts Council, 2017.

References 

Created via preloaddraft
Canadian women artists
Living people
First Nations artists
First Nations activists
University of Winnipeg alumni
University of British Columbia alumni
Year of birth missing (living people)
Ojibwe people
Canadian art curators
Canadian women curators
Indigenous curators of the Americas